Magdalena Ribbing (30 July 1940 – 29 September 2017) was a Swedish writer, journalist, etiquette expert and lecturer. She married radio journalist Thomas Hempel in 1981.

Career
Ribbing belonged to the noble Ribbing family, whose history can be dated back to the 900s. She wrote a book about her family history, and made a documentary about the killer of King Gustav III, her ancestor Adolph Ludvig Ribbing.

Between 1970 and 2000, Ribbing worked as a political reporter for Dagens Nyheter, and from 1993 until 1999 she was the editor in chief of the Namn & nytt department of the paper. Ribbing was a "Sommarpratare" (Summer Presenter) on the Sveriges Radio show Sommar i P1 twice, on 13 June 1994 and 21 June 2000.

In the Dagens Nyheter newspaper, she wrote a column answering questions about etiquette, manners and style. She also wrote fifteen books about the subject, published by Bokförlag DN, Forum and Natur & Kultur.

She was the opening speaker at Stockholm Pride in 2010.

On 29 September 2017, she died after a fall in her home.

Bibliography
 1969 – Smycken : ädla stenar, pärlor, guld, silver och platina
 1984 – Smyckeboken
 1985 – Etikettboken : allt man behöver veta för att kunna strunta i (along with Sighsten Herrgård)
 1989 – Festboken : med kalasetikett (along with Alexandra Charles)
 1991 – Nya etikettboken : spelregler för väluppfostrade
 1992 – Lilla etikettboken : rätt och vänligt sätt för trevliga barn
 1995 – Ätten Ribbing : 700 år i Sveriges historia
 1996 – Smycken & silver för tsarer, drottningar och andra
 1997 – Nya etikettboken : spelregler för väluppfostrade
 1998 – Det judiska Stockholm, co-writer
 2000 – Stora Etikettboken : hyfs, umgängeskonst och ytlig bildning
 2000 – Smycken & silver för tsarer, drottningar och andra
 2001 – Det går an! frågor och svar om modern etikett
 2002 – Ja! : allt om bröllop : från frieri till morgongåva
 2002 – Kärleksfullt från Parma: människorna, maten, traditionerna (along with Anna Maria Corazza Bildt)
 2003 – Hålla tal : välkomsttal, tacktal, festtal, hyllningstal, bröllopstal
 2004 – Ja! : allt om bröllop : från frieri till morgongåva
 2005 – Nya Stora Etikettboken
 2006 – Den vackre kungamördaren Adolph Ludvig Ribbing. Om en särdeles man och hans samtida åren 1765–1843
 2008 – Snabbetikett
 2008 – Hålla tal (nyskriven utgåva)
 2008 – Det dukade bordet
 2009 – Bröllopsboken
 2009 – Bra att veta för alla unga, lätt om vett och etikett
 2010 – Ringar – trohet, tillhörighet, glädje
 2011 – Etikett på jobbet – bra att veta på kontoret
 2013 – Stora stunder – Etikett för fest och högtid

References

Further reading

External links

1940 births
2017 deaths
Swedish writers
Swedish nobility
Writers from Stockholm